The Nordic Futsal Championships, or in short NFC, was arranged 2006 for the first time in Stockholm by Stockholm Futsal Club. It is a club competition for the champions in each Nordic country (Finland, Denmark, Norway and Sweden).

NFC was started back in 2006 when Stockholm Futsal Club invited all the Nordic champions to determine what team was the best in the Nordics in futsal. The cup has since then been played several times but since 2013 it is an annual cup. At the cup 2013 the participating clubs agreed on a format of the cup saying the winners will arrange the next cup as a preparation for the UEFA-cup. Since then the cup is played annually, a couple of weeks before the UEFA-cup qualifying round in August. Deliberately there are no statutes or regulations for the cup, so just like the whisper game it tends to shift from year to year in the format. The ambition was to let the winning club continue to develop the cup and make it better from year to year and with sanction from each football federation.

No one can claim ownership of the cup, the cup is a virtual cup with no one responsible other than the current Nordic Champions. The only information to be found is on the cup Facebook page where the host of the cup will inform of the next cup.

Summaries

Records and statistics

Winners by nation

Winners by club

References

External links
 Official website

 
International club futsal competitions
Futsal competitions in Sweden
Futsal competitions in Finland
Futsal competitions in Denmark
Futsal competitions in Norway
2006 establishments in Europe
Futsal competitions in Europe